Rebecca Morse may refer to:

 Rebecca Morse (journalist) (born 1977), Australian journalist and news presenter
 Rebecca A. Morse (1821–?), American club leader
 Rebecca Morse (ice hockey) (born 1992), American ice hockey defender